The paradise drongo or ribbon-tailed drongo (Dicrurus megarhynchus) is a species of bird in the family Dicruridae. It is endemic to New Ireland in the Bismarck Archipelago, Papua New Guinea.

Taxonomy
The paradise drongo was described by the French zoologists Jean Quoy and Joseph Gaimard in 1832 from a specimen that they believed had been collected in Dorey (now Manokwari) in New Guinea. They coined the binomial name, Edolius megarhynchus. The English zoologist Philip Sclater pointed out in 1877 that the location reported by Quoy and Gaimard was probably an error. Specimens had been collected from New Ireland in the Bismarck Archipelago but none had been obtained from New Guinea. The type locality is now designated as Port Praslin near the southern point of New Ireland.

Notes

References

External links
Image at ADW

paradise drongo
Birds of New Ireland Province
paradise drongo
Taxonomy articles created by Polbot